Jennifer Gross (born  1976) is an American basketball coach who is currently the head women's basketball coach at the University of California, Davis.

Playing career 
Gross was a four-year player at UC Davis from 1993 to 1997, where she set school records for career assists, steals, and three-pointers made. She had a brief professional career playing overseas in Denmark and Israel before turning towards coaching.

Coaching career 
Gross started as an assistant at her alma mater University City High School in San Diego, also spending time as a head coach there before joining the San Diego State staff as an assistant.

UC Davis 
Gross joined her alma mater in 2004 as an assistant coach, and was promoted to associate head coach before the 2008–09 season. She was named the successor to head coach Sandy Simpson before the 2010–11 season after he announced his retirement.

Gross signed an extension to remain at UC Davis in 2021. The five-year deal also has automatic renewal extensions for the next five years after that, making it the longest contract extension given to a head coach in UC Davis athletic department history.

Head coaching record

References

External links 
 UC Davis Aggies profile

1970s births
Living people
Year of birth uncertain
Basketball players from San Diego
American expatriate basketball people in Denmark
American expatriate basketball people in Israel
Basketball coaches from California
UC Davis Aggies women's basketball players
High school basketball coaches in California
San Diego State Aztecs women's basketball coaches
UC Davis Aggies women's basketball coaches